The Tamayama Formation is a Santonian geologic formation in Japan. Dinosaur remains not referrable to the genus level are among the fossils that have been recovered from the formation. The lower and middle part of the formation consists of braided river sandstone, while the upper portion consists of upper shoreface to inner shelf sandstone. Fossil plants are known from the formation, along with a species of Inoceramus

Palaeofauna
Futabasaurus
Inoceramus
Plantae indet.
Titanosauria indet.

See also

 List of dinosaur-bearing rock formations
 List of stratigraphic units with few dinosaur genera

Footnotes

References
 Weishampel, David B.; Dodson, Peter; and Osmólska, Halszka (eds.): The Dinosauria, 2nd, Berkeley: University of California Press. 861 pp. .

Geologic formations of Japan
Santonian Stage
Upper Cretaceous Series of Asia